The Ancient World is a series of documentaries presented by historian Bettany Hughes that gives viewers a personal take on ancient world cultures. The documentaries aired on Channel 4 network over a period of eight years and were packaged with new introductions as "Bettany Hughes' Ancient World".

Episode list

References

British military television series
British documentary television series
Channel 4 documentary series